The Irish Poor Laws were a series of Acts of Parliament intended to address social instability due to widespread and persistent poverty in Ireland. While some legislation had been introduced by the pre-Union Parliament of Ireland prior to the Act of Union, the most radical and comprehensive attempt was the Irish act of 1838, closely modelled on the English Poor Law of 1834. In England, this replaced Elizabethan era legislation which had no equivalent in Ireland.

Pre-Union

In 1703, the Irish Parliament passed an act for "Providing the erection of a workhouse and for the maintenance and apprenticing out of foundling children". By 1771, there were Houses of Industry in every county and by 1833, the total cost was £32,967.

Post-Union
Until 1838, the use of 'Houses of industry' was on a much smaller scale than in England and Wales.

Poor Law Unions

The report of the Royal Commission on the Poorer Classes in Ireland 1833 led to the Irish Poor Law Act of 1838, under which three "poor law commissioners" divided Ireland into poor law unions, in which paupers would receive poor relief (either workhouse or outdoor relief) paid for by a poor rate based on a "poor law valuation". The name "union" was retained from the English "union of parishes" model although the Irish union boundaries diverged greatly from those of the civil parishes. A union was named after the town on which it was centred, where its workhouse was located. Unions were defined as groups of poor law electoral divisions, in turn defined as groups of townlands. Electoral divisions returned members to the board of guardians, with voters who paid higher rates having more votes. During and after the Great Famine, boundaries in the impoverished west were redrawn to create more and smaller union for easier administration.  When the Irish General Register Office was established in 1864, each union became a superintendent registrar's district, with groups of electoral divisions forming a dispensary or registrar's district. The Local Government (Ireland) Act 1898 divided administrative counties into urban and rural districts, with each rural district corresponding to the non-urban portion of a poor law union within the county.

Emigration

During the Great Famine, workhouses became so overwhelmed that large numbers of paupers were assisted to emigrate. This had the effect of permitting more to enter the workhouse in the hope of escaping starvation and disease. In response, Guardian-assisted emigration was reserved only for those who had received indoor relief for over two years.

After partition
Following the Partition of Ireland, in the independent Irish Free State, poor law unions and rural districts were abolished in 1925 and the powers of boards of guardians transferred to the county councils'  County Boards of Health or County Boards of Public Assistance.

In Northern Ireland, poor law unions survived until the Northern Ireland Health and Social Care Service in 1948.

See also
Scottish Poor Law
English Poor Law
List of Irish Poor Law Unions

References

Further reading

Contemporary accounts
Nassau William Senior –  Letter...on a legal provision for the Irish poor (1831)
 Poulett Scrope, George  Necessity of Poor Law for Ireland in Principles of political economy (1833)
  English tourist, EG Inglis, visits Dublin's Mendicity Institute, House of Industry and Foundling Hospital (1834)
  Selection of Parochial Examinations Relative to the Destitute Classes in Ireland  Royal Commission of Enquiry (1835)
 George Nicholls –  Poor laws—Ireland: Three reports (1838)
 Torrens, Robert Plan of an association in aid of the Irish Poor Law (1838)
 Poulett Scrope, George – Letters to the Right Hon. Lord John Russell, on the expediency of enlarging the Irish poor-law to the full extent of the poor-law of England (1846)

19th century
O'Connor, John  The Workhouses of Ireland: The Fate of Ireland's Poor 1995 : 
Crossman, Virginia Politics, Pauperism and Power in Late Nineteenth-century Ireland : 2006 : 
 Burke, Helen The people and the poor law in 19th century Ireland : 1987 : 
 *Butt, Isaac The poor-law bill for Ireland examined, its provisions and the report of Mr. Nicholls contrasted ... (1837) at Internet Archive.
MacDonagh, Oliver : The Poor Law, Emigration and the Irish Question 1830–'55 : in Christus Rex – Studies in Irish History : January 1958
Gray, Peter The Making of the Irish Poor Law, 1815–43 MUP 2009 
Collison Black, R.D – Economic Thought and the Irish Question 1817–1870, 1993 (reprint of 1960)

20th century
 Anderson, James Pauperism: Poor Relief in Ireland—Some Suggestions (from "Ireland's Hope: A Call to Service"), 1913
Kely, G O, Donnell, A Kennedy, P Quin, S Irish Social Policy In Context:(1999) Dublin University College Dublin Press

External links

The Workhouse in Ireland
Hidden Wexford Genealogy – births in the Wexford Workhouse 1851–1893
Elements of Irish Poor Law Repealed Irish Statute Book 
Irish Poor Law Union and their Records from Ask About Ireland, an Irish government sponsored portal.
Guide to the records of the Poor Law from the National Archives of Ireland.
The Irish Poor Law and the Great Famine
Condition of the poorer classes in Ireland: first report: appendix A and supplement 1835 Whately report (1218 pages) available through EPPI.